is a railway station on the Tokyu Meguro Line in Meguro, Tokyo, Japan, operated by the private railway operator Tokyu Corporation.

Lines
Only "Local" all-stations services stop at this station.

Station layout
This station consists of two opposed side platforms serving two tracks.

Platforms

History

The station opened on 11 March 1923.

Passenger statistics

Surrounding area
 Showa University Senzoku Campus

See also
 List of railway stations in Japan

References

External links

  

Tokyu Meguro Line
Railway stations in Tokyo
Railway stations in Japan opened in 1923